Barbara Steele (born 29 December 1937) is an English film actress known for starring in Italian gothic horror films of the 1960s. She has been referred to as the "Queen of All Scream Queens" and  "Britain's first lady of horror". She played the dual role of Asa and Katia Vajda in Mario Bava's landmark film Black Sunday (1960), and starred in The Pit and the Pendulum (1961),  (1962),  (1964), and Castle of Blood (1964).

Additionally, Steele had supporting roles in Federico Fellini's 8½ (1963), David Cronenberg's Shivers (1975), and Louis Malle's Pretty Baby (1978), and appeared on television in the 1991 TV series Dark Shadows. She won a Primetime Emmy Award for producing the American television miniseries War and Remembrance (1988–1989). Steele appeared in several films in the 2010s, including a lead role in The Butterfly Room (2012) and supporting role in Ryan Gosling's Lost River (2014).

Early life 
Steele was born in Birkenhead, Cheshire. She studied art at the Chelsea Art School and in Paris at the Sorbonne.

Career 
During the 1960s, Steele starred in a string of Italian horror films, including Black Sunday (1960), The Horrible Dr. Hichcock (1962), The Ghost (1963), The Long Hair of Death (1964), Castle of Blood (1964), Terror-Creatures from the Grave and Nightmare Castle (both 1965). She also starred in Roger Corman's adaptation of The Pit and the Pendulum (1961), based on Edgar Allan Poe's short story of the same title, and the British film Curse of the Crimson Altar (1968).

Steele guest starred in British television shows including the spy drama, Danger Man (aka Secret Agent) starring Patrick McGoohan in 1965. She made her American television debut in 1960 as Dolores in the "Daughter of Illusion" episode of the ABC series, Adventures in Paradise, starring Gardner McKay. In that same year, she was replaced by Barbara Eden in the Elvis Presley film Flaming Star after a disagreement with director Don Siegel. In 1961, she appeared as Phyllis in the "Beta Delta Gamma" episode of CBS's Alfred Hitchcock Presents. She also had an supporting role in Federico Fellini's 8½ (1963), and in 1966 appeared in the second-season episode of NBC's I Spy, "Bridge of Spies".

Steele returned to the horror genre in the later 1970s, appearing in three horror films: David Cronenberg's Shivers (a.k.a. They Came From Within) (1975),  Piranha (1978), and The Silent Scream (1979).

Steele served as associate producer of the TV miniseries, The Winds of War (1983), and was a producer for its sequel, War and Remembrance (1988), for which she shared the 1989 Emmy Award for Outstanding Drama/Comedy Special with executive producer Dan Curtis.

Steele was cast as Julia Hoffman in the 1991 remake of the 1960s ABC television series Dark Shadows. In 2010, she was a guest star in the Dark Shadows audio drama, The Night Whispers.

In 2010, actor-writer Mark Gatiss interviewed Steele about her role in Black Sunday for his BBC documentary series A History of Horror. In 2012, Gatiss again interviewed Steele about her role in Shivers for his follow-up documentary, Horror Europa. In 2014, she appeared in Ryan Gosling's directorial debut, the drama-fantasy thriller film Lost River, in which she portrayed the character Belladonna in a supporting role.

Personal life 
Steele was married to American screenwriter James Poe. They were married in 1969 and divorced in 1978.

Filmography

Film

Television

References 

Works cited

External links 

 
 
 Barbara Steele biography on (re)Search my Trash
 Watch Barbara Steele in Nightmare Castle

1937 births
Living people
English film actresses
English television actresses
People from Birkenhead
20th-century English actresses
21st-century English actresses
Actresses from Cheshire
English expatriates in Italy